Blue Lake, also called Sterling Forest Lake, is a lake located in Sterling Forest State Park, New York. The lake contains a number of fish species including Brown Trout, Rainbow Trout, Largemouth Bass, Chain Pickerel and Panfish. Fishing is permitted and the lake has the only boat launch within the state park, but no gas motors are allowed.

As of 2018, the Blue Lake Reservoir System, operated by SUEZ North America (formerly United Water), supplies drinking water from Blue Lake to about 1,200 people.

History 
Blue Lake was created in 1956 when the stream originating at Little Cedar Pond to the northwest was dammed, inundating the area. In 1960, the International Nickel Company (INCO) purchased property overlooking the lake where they built a facility. That facility, which ceased operation in the late 1980s, included a headquarters office and a research center called the Paul D. Merica Laboratory. After remaining vacant for decades, the old INCO facility was replaced in 2016 by the newly constructed world headquarters of Jehovah's Witnesses. The only other facility adjacent to Blue Lake is owned by IBM. Originally built in the early 1970s, it now hosts a business continuity and recovery center.

References

Lakes of New York (state)
Ramapos
Warwick, New York
Fishing in the United States
Reservoirs in New York (state)